The first elections to the Goa, Daman & Diu Legislative Assembly were held in December 1963, to elect members of the 30 constituencies, in the Union territory of Goa, Daman and Diu, India.

The Maharashtrawadi Gomantak Party won the most seats (fourteen), and its leader, Dayanand Bandodkar was appointed as the Chief Minister of Goa, Daman and Diu. The United Goans Party won 12 seats, three seats were won by Independents, whereas the Jawaharlal Nehru-led Indian National Congress only won one seat.

Background
After the Annexation of Dadra and Nagar Haveli in 1954, followed by the Annexation of Goa in 1961, the new union territory of Goa, Daman and Diu was established. Later, in 1963, after the passing of the Government of Union Territories Act, 1963, Goa, Daman and Diu was assigned a Legislative Assembly of thirty seats.

To facilitate the upcoming election, A. F. Couto was made the Chief Electoral Officer of the union territory on 19 August 1963. The Delimitation Commission of India split up the Union territory into 30 constituencies; 28 in Goa and one each for Daman and Diu. On 3 October, it was announced that the Indian National Congress, Frente Popular and the Maharashtrawadi Gomantak Party (MGP) were allowed to have reserved electoral symbols, followed on 24 October, by the United Goans Party (UGP).

Election Schedule

Results

Elected Members

Aftermath
On 20 December 1963, Dayanand Bandodkar was sworn in as Chief Minister. His cabinet included only two other ministers, Vitthal Subrai and Tony Fernandes. Jack de Sequeira, of the UGP, was the first Leader of the Opposition and Pandurang Purushottam Shirodkar was the first Speaker of the Assembly.

Since the party in government, the MGP, was in favour of merging the territory with Maharashtra, they precipitated the issue. This led to the 1967 Goa status referendum, where the voters rejected the merger and instead opted to remain a Union Territory.

Bypolls

See also 
 List of constituencies of the Goa Legislative Assembly

References

Goa
1963
1960
1963